Kitonga is a town in eastern Tanzania near the coast.

Transport 

It is served by a station on a cross-country line of the national railway network.

See also 

 Railway stations in Tanzania

References 

Populated places in Pwani Region